The governor of Quezon is the local chief executive of the Philippine province of Quezon, which was previously called Tayabas until 1946.

List of governors of Quezon

Notes

References 

Governors of provinces of the Philippines
Politics of Quezon